David James Moonlight (born August 9, 1979) is a Canadian retired rugby union player. He played on the wing for Canada. He made his debut against England at Twickenham on November 13, 2004. Moonlight played his last Test against the United States of America at Edmonton on June 26, 2005. In addition to being fully capped with the national XV squad, David is also one of Canada's greatest sevens internationals. He is the leading points and try scorer for Canada in sevens. Most recently attended the Scotland leg of the IRB World Series. He now works as a teacher

References 

Player profile

1979 births
Living people
Canadian rugby union players
Canada international rugby union players
Canada international rugby sevens players